Robinson Creek is a stream located within Pike County, Kentucky. It is a tributary of Shelby Creek.

Robinson Creek has the name of Joseph Robinson, who settled near it.

See also
List of rivers of Kentucky

References

Rivers of Pike County, Kentucky
Rivers of Kentucky